Khalid Al-Hashemi (Arabic:خالد الهاشمي) (born 18 March 1997) is an Emirati footballer. He currently plays as a defender for Baniyas.

Career
Al-Hashemi started his career at Baniyas and is a product of the Baniyas's youth system. On 14 January 2017, Al-Hashemi made his professional debut for Baniyas against Al-Ain in the Pro League.

External links

References

1997 births
Living people
Emirati footballers
Baniyas Club players
UAE Pro League players
UAE First Division League players
Association football defenders
Place of birth missing (living people)